is a financial services company based in Tokyo, Japan. Monex Inc., its main subsidiary, engages in online securities trading, with approximately 2 million accounts. TradeStation, its US subsidiary, provides securities, options, futures and cryptocurrency trading services. The Monex Group acquired Coincheck, which is one of the largest crypto exchanges in Japan, in April 2018.

References 

Companies listed on the Tokyo Stock Exchange
Financial services companies based in Tokyo
Online brokerages
Financial services companies established in 1999
Japanese companies established in 1999